The following is a list of mountains in Thailand. The elevations are in metres. Latin script uses the Royal Thai General System of Transcription.

Note:
Many mountains in the country are not important because of their height, but because of their symbolic and cultural significance. Some mountains have holy places at the summit, like Doi Suthep near Chiang Mai, while others have been adopted as provincial symbols, like relatively small Khao Sam Muk in Chonburi Province. Nevertheless, since the order of height is convenient, the list follows this order, without in any way intending to diminish or promote the importance of any particular mountain.

List

Greater than 2,000 m

Greater than 1,000 m

Below 1,000 m

Bibliography 
 Avijit Gupta, The Physical Geography of Southeast Asia, Oxford University Press, 2005. 
 Wolf Donner: The Five Faces of Thailand. Institute of Asian Affairs, Hamburg 1978, Paperback Edition: University of Queensland Press, St. Lucia, Queensland 1982,

References

External links
 Bangkok Post, "Thailand's highest mountains"
 ดอยหลวงพะเยาขุนเขาผู้ไม่ท้อ 
 Peakery – Chiang Rai

Thailand

Mountains
Thailand